The Punisher is a 1989 American action film directed by Mark Goldblatt, written by Boaz Yakin, and starring Dolph Lundgren and Louis Gossett Jr. Based on the Punisher character from Marvel Comics, the film changes many details of origin, and eliminates the signature T-shirt skull logo and instead has the knife with the skull. It was shot in Sydney, co-starring Jeroen Krabbé, Kim Miyori, Nancy Everhard, and Barry Otto.

Plot
Frank Castle is a former undercover police detective and U.S. Marine whose wife Julie was killed five years ago, along with their two daughters, by a Mafia car bomb intended for Frank who is also presumed to be dead. Castle has since become the city's most wanted, and most mysterious, vigilante - known only as "The Punisher". He now lives in the city's labyrinthine sewer-system, having assassinated 125 mobsters (not counting henchmen) in the past half-decade. His work is known by the use of special throwing-knives engraved with a skull. Castle's sole ally in his one-man war against organized crime is Shake (taken from Shakespeare and "the shakes"), a stage-performer-turned derelict who typically speaks in rhyme.

The underworld families have become so weakened by the Punisher's guerrilla warfare that kingpin Gianni Franco is forced out of retirement. Franco plans to unify the decimated families. However, this attracts unwanted attention from the Yakuza, Asia's most powerful crime syndicate. Led by Lady Tanaka, the Yakuza decide to take over the Mafia families and all of their interests. In order to sway the mobsters to their cause, they kidnap their children and hold them for ransom.

Shake pleads with the Punisher to save the children, who are likely to be sold into the Arab slave trade regardless of whether the Mafia give into the demands. The Punisher attacks Yakuza businesses, warning that for every day the children are held in captivity, he will inflict heavy costs on them in property damage. The Yakuza later capture the Punisher and Shake and attempt to torture them into submission, but the Punisher breaks free and decides the only course of action is a direct rescue.

He is able to save most of the children and commandeers a bus to get the kidnapped children to safety. However prior to this Tommy Franco, the son of Gianni Franco, had been taken away to Yakuza headquarters. When driving the busload of kids, the Punisher runs into a police roadblock and is arrested. While in custody Castle is reunited with one of his old partners, who warns his multiple killings will likely get him executed, however at a later point Castle is broken out of jail by Franco's men. Franco admits he brought this on himself as the hit on Castle's family was an error, and persuades the Punisher to help him save his son. Castle agrees to work with his old enemy for the sake of stopping the Japanese criminal underworld from taking root in America.

Franco and the Punisher raid the Yakuza headquarters, fight and kill all the Yakuza, including Lady Tanaka and her daughter. Upon being reunited with his son, Franco betrays the Punisher, but the Punisher defends himself and kills Franco. Franco's son Tommy then threatens the Punisher for killing his father, but cannot bring himself to take revenge. Castle warns Gianni Franco's son, Tommy Franco, to "stay a good boy, and grow up to be a good man", not following his father's misdeeds. He also warns he will return should the boy commit any crimes, then disappears. The police arrive, only to find no trace of the Punisher. Meanwhile, at his lair, Castle narrates that he'll be waiting "in the shadows".

Cast

 Dolph Lundgren as Francis "Frank" Castle / The Punisher
 Louis Gossett Jr. as Detective Jake Berkowitz
 Jeroen Krabbé as Gianni Franco
 Kim Miyori as Lady Tanaka
 Bryan Marshall as Dino Moretti
 Nancy Everhard as Detective Samantha "Sam" Leary
 Barry Otto as "Shake"
 Brian Rooney as Tommy Franco
 Zoska Aleece as Tanaka's Daughter (Zoshka Mizak)
 Larry McCormick as TV Newsreader
 Kenji Yamaki as Sato, Tanaka's Bodyguard
 Todd Boyce as Tarrone
 Hirofumi Kanayama as Tomio, Tanaka's Bodyguard
 Lani John Tupu as Laccone
 Giancarlo Negroponte as Musso
 May Lloyd as Julie Castle 
 Brooke Anderson as Annie Castle
 Holly Rogers as Felice Castle
 Char Fontane as Laurie Silver
 Isao Hirata as Ito
 Brett Williams as Tim
 David Arnett as Joe
 Donal Gibson as Bill
 Lawrence Woodward as Mickey
 Johnny Raaen as Joey
 Robert Simper as Danny
 Brian McDermott as O'Banion
 Colin Leong as Cutter Captain
 Christian Manon as French Leader
 Fotis Pelekis as Mario
 James Klein as Nicholas
 Robert Fraser as Robert
 Dominic Baudish as Dominic
 Cathy Stirk as Caterina
 Emily Nicol as Cathy
 Courtney Keiler as Sophia
 Noga Bernstein as Ginny
 Emma Soloman as Ginny's Girlfriend

Production

Christopher Lambert was the original choice for the role of Frank Castle. But an ankle injury forced him to withdraw. Steven Seagal was interested in playing the role. Nicole Kidman was initially cast. Contrary to rumors, Michael Paré was not considered for the role of Frank Castle.

Production took place in Sydney.

Music

A full orchestral score was composed and conducted by Dennis Dreith at the Warner Bros. soundstage in Burbank, California. A CD of the soundtrack was not released until July 19, 2005 (Perseverance Records, PRD006). The CD includes the complete multi-track stereo recording, as well as a 22-minutes interview with the composer Dennis Dreith and the director Mark Goldblatt. Perseverance Records also released a new 5.1 mix as a SACD, in collaboration with Tarantula Records (TARAN001). The American DVD release only contains a monaural (single track) soundtrack, despite the film being mixed in Dolby Stereo. The 2013 German and UK Blu-ray/DVD editions were presented with 2.0 and 5.1 (Dolby Digital and DTS-HD MA) sound tracks although the UK disc was made from mono tracks.

Release

Theatrical
The film was given a worldwide theatrical release, except in the United States, Sweden, and South Africa. It was originally slated for a US release in August 1989, as trailers were created by New World. It premiered in Germany and France in October 1989 and was shown months later at the Los Angeles Comic Book and Sci-fi Convention in July 1990. However, the film never received a wide theatrical release in the United States due to New World's financial difficulties and its new owners not having an interest in theatrical distribution.

Home media
It was sold to Live Entertainment (now Lionsgate) who released it direct-to-video on VHS and Laserdisc in April 1991. It finally premiered at the 2008 Escapism Film Festival in Durham, North Carolina where director Mark Goldblatt screened his own personal 35mm print. He showed that again in April 2009 at the Dolph Lundgren Film Fest hosted by the New Beverly theater.

Reception

Critical response
Review aggregation website Rotten Tomatoes gave the film an approval rating of 28% based on 18 reviews, with an average rating of 3.75/10. The site's consensus states: "Despite the seemingly indestructible Dolph Lundgren with a crossbow, The Punisher is a boring one-man battle with never-ending action scenes". On Metacritic, the film has a weighted average score of 63 out of 100, based on 4 critics, indicating "generally favorable reviews". Christopher Null gave the film 1 out of 5, stating the film was "marred by cheeseball sets and special effects, lame fight sequences, and some of the worst acting ever to disgrace the screen". MTV.com cited it as an example of a failed comic book film, complaining that the film omitted aspects of the character that made him compelling, and would have served better following closer to the plot of the source material. Criticizing the film's storyline and acting, Time Out magazine concluded the film was "destructive, reprehensible, and marvelous fun". TV Guides movie guide gave the film three out of four stars, praising Lundgren's performance and compared the characterization of the Punisher to that of Frank Miller's re-imagining of Batman in The Dark Knight Returns. They further praised the film's atmosphere, calling it "genuinely comic book-like, rather than cartoonish".

Legacy
In 1989, Dolph Lundgren revealed that he was trying something different and he liked the Punisher. In 1990, New World promoted The Punisher II and The X-Men animated film, but there have been no further development news.

The 1990 tie-in video game The Punisher featured images from the film in the commercial. Similarities between the film and the 1993 video game The Punisher include the assault on a casino by breaking through the ceiling and the female assassin.

In 2019, Lundgren reprised the role in a photo shoot.

Other media
In June 1990, a 64-page comic adaption of the film, written by Carl Potts and pencilled by Brent Anderson, was released by Marvel.

In 2004 a reboot starring Thomas Jane, titled The Punisher was released by Lions Gate Films and Columbia Pictures.

References

External links
 
 
 The Punisher on Dolph-Ultimate.com
 The Punisher at Oz Movies
 The Punisher  at Superheroes Lives

1989 action thriller films
1980s vigilante films
1989 films
American action thriller films
American crime drama films
American vigilante films
Australian action adventure films
Australian crime drama films
Australian vigilante films
BDSM in films
1980s English-language films
Films about child abduction in the United States
Films shot in Sydney
Films with screenplays by Boaz Yakin
Japan in non-Japanese culture
New World Pictures films
Punisher films
Yakuza films
American exploitation films
Films directed by Mark Goldblatt
1980s American films
Live-action films based on Marvel Comics